Paul Scott (26 October 1872 – 1950) was a South African international rugby union player who played as a forward.

He made 4 appearances for South Africa against the British Lions in 1896.

References

South African rugby union players
South Africa international rugby union players
1872 births
1950 deaths
Rugby union forwards